The Serra do Acari or Acari Mountains are a mountain range in the border of Brazil and Guyana. The range runs through the north side of the Brazilian city of Oriximiná, Pará, and the south side of East Berbice-Corentyne region in Guyana.

References 

Mountain ranges of South America
Acari
Landforms of Pará
Highest points of Brazilian states